Dr. Bence Stágel (born December 21, 1978) is a Hungarian jurist and politician, member of the National Assembly (MP) from Fidesz–KDNP National List between 2010 and 2013.

He was elected MP from the party's National List in September 2010, replacing Pál Schmitt, who became President of Hungary in August 2010. Stágel served as a member of the Committee on Youth, Social, Family and Housing Affairs since October 4, 2010 and Committee of National Cohesion between January 1, 2011 and March 4, 2013. He was appointed one of the recorders of the National Assembly on February 22, 2011. He resigned from his parliamentary seat for personal reasons on May 31, 2013. He was replaced by Balázs Hidvéghi (Fidesz).

References

1978 births
Living people
Hungarian jurists
Christian Democratic People's Party (Hungary) politicians
Members of the National Assembly of Hungary (2010–2014)
Politicians from Budapest